Orinoco Flow – The Music of Enya (1996) is the first album released by the Taliesin Orchestra, and is a tribute to the Irish singer Enya.  There have been three other Enya tribute albums released by the Orchestra: Maiden of Mysteries, An Instrumental Tribute to the Hits of Enya, and Thread of Time.

Track listing

"Orinoco Flow" – 4:14
"Athair Ar Neamh" – 3:39
"The Memories of Trees – 4:22
"No Holly for Miss Quinn – 2:27
"Lothlorien" – 3:21
"From Where I Am" – 3:44
"Book of Days" – 3:24
"China Roses" – 3:57
"Watermark" – 3:27
"Bard Dance" – 3:02
"Celts" – 3:49

Personnel

Gary Rice – Mastering 
Charles Sayre – Arranger, Conductor 
David Shumway  Cello 
Robert Spates – Violin 
Jim Zumpano – Engineer 
Felicia Sorensen – Vocals 
Barbara Brown – Cello 
Barry Gibbons – Engineer 
Lee Johnson – Assistant Producer
Scott Larsen – Artwork 
Kathy Birch – Cello 
Lee Brewster – Violin 
Riza Browder – Violin 
Bill Comita – Cello 
Jeff Girdler – French Horn 
James Gollmer – French Horn 
Jennifer Himes – Violin 
Harriette Hurd – Violin 
Linda Kapusciars – Cello 
Phyllis Mauney – Harp 
Sue Midkiff – Violin 
Jon Nazdin – Bass 
Kurt Newubert – Violin 
Simon Rundlett – Violin 
Nancy Jo Snider – Cello 
Phil Splezter – Violin 
Judy Steinmeyer – Violin 
Lisa Sayre – Oboe, Whistle (Instrument) 
Roger Whitworth – French Horn 
Eric Lemley – Engineer 
Amy Comtrolis – Cello 
Kenneth Soper – French Horn 
Belinda Swanson – Violin 
Bruno Nasta – Violin, Concert Master
Leslie Ludena – Violin
Trammell Starks – Keyboards, Editing, Mixing, Producer

Trivia

The sixth song, "From Where I Am," is sometimes called "For Where I Am."

See also

Taliesin Orchestra
Maiden of Mysteries: The Music of Enya
Orinoco Flow
Enya

References
"Track listing"  and "The Orchestra" information taken from Artist Direct.

1996 albums
Enya tribute albums
Taliesin Orchestra albums